Pope Productions is a St. John's, Newfoundland and Labrador based company specializing in feature film, documentary and television formats. Founded in 1998 by Paul Pope, it has grown to be a prominent independent production company in Newfoundland and Labrador.

Founder Paul Pope died in April 2022. He was posthumously named by the Academy of Canadian Cinema and Television as a recipient of its Board of Directors Tribute Award at the 11th Canadian Screen Awards in 2023.

Titles
Above and Beyond
Diverted
Grown Up Movie Star
Hudson & Rex
Life with Derek
My Left Breast
Rare Birds
Record Man
The One That Got Away
The Wall

References

External links
 Pope Productions Official Site

Film production companies of Canada
Companies based in St. John's, Newfoundland and Labrador
Cinema of Newfoundland and Labrador
Television production companies of Canada